José Bonet Solves (Valencia, June 18, 1955) is a Spanish mathematician specialist in functional analysis and its applications to complex analysis and linear partial differential equations.

Academic biography 
José Bonet graduated in Mathematics at the University of Valencia in 1977. In 1980 he defended his Ph.D. thesis in that University under the supervision of Professor Manuel Valdivia Ureña. Bonet was assistant in the University of Valencia from 1977 to 1983; between 1983 and 1987 he was Associate Professor, in the Polytechnic University of Valencia. Since 1987, Bonet is Full Professor in the Applied Mathematics Department at the Polytechnic University of Valencia. He was also Visiting Professor in the University of Paderborn, Germany in 1989 and in 2002. He had an Alexander Von Humboldt fellowship in Düsseldorf (1994), Paderborn (1995, 2008) and Eichstätt (2008, 2013, 2017); Germany.

He has been the Director of the institute of mathematics Instituto Universitario de Matemática Pura y Aplicada IUMPA
 at the Polytechnic University of Valencia from 2004 until November 2016.

He also organized several international meetings on functional analysis.

He supervised fifteen Ph.D. thesis.

Publications
Coauthor of the book “Barrelled Locally Convex Spaces” published by North-Holland in 1987. 
Coeditor of the books “Progress in Functional Analysis” and “Recent Progress in Functional Analysis”, published by North-Holland in 1992 and 2002, respectively. *Coeditor of the book “Topics in Complex Analysis and Operator Theory” published by the American Mathematical Society in 2012. 
Author of more than 200 research papers published in international mathematics journals since 1980, like Advances in Mathematics, Journal of Functional Analysis, Transactions of the American Mathematical Society, Journal of the London Mathematical Society, Mathematische Zeitschrift, Studia Mathematica, etc. Most of this papers have been written in collaboration with researchers from Germany, the United States, Italy, Finland, Poland, etc. The publications received several citations.
Editor of the journals RACSAM, Journal of Mathematical Analysis and Applications, Mediterranean Journal of Mathematics, Banach Journal of Mathematical Analysis y Functiones et Approximatio Commentarii Mathematici.

Honours
Corresponding member of the Société Royale des Sciences de Liège Belgium since 1992.
Corresponding member of the Spanish Royal Academy of Sciences since 1994. 
Full member of the Spanish Royal Academy of Sciences, elected since 2005. Entrance lecture presented on April 23, 2008.
Medal of the Real Sociedad Matemática Española in 2016.
 President of the Mathematics Section of the Spanish Royal Academy of Sciences since 2018.

Awards
First National Prize for Termination of University Studies in Mathematics, Primer Premio Nacional de Terminación de Estudios en Matemáticas of the Spanish Ministry of Education in 1977. 
Premio Extraordinario de Licenciatura  (Prize for the Graduation) in Mathematics of the University of Valencia in 1978.
Premio Extraordinario de Doctorado (Prize for the Doctor Thesis) in Mathematics of the University of Valencia in 1980.

References

1955 births
Living people
Functional analysts
Mathematical analysts
Academic staff of the Technical University of Valencia
University of Valencia alumni
20th-century Spanish mathematicians
21st-century Spanish mathematicians